In geometry, a polytope (for example, a polygon or a polyhedron) or a tiling is isotoxal or edge-transitive if its symmetries act transitively on its edges. Informally, this means that there is only one type of edge to the object: given two edges, there is a translation, rotation, and/or reflection that will move one edge to the other, while leaving the region occupied by the object unchanged.

Isotoxal polygons 
An isotoxal polygon is an even-sided i.e. equilateral polygon, but not all equilateral polygons are isotoxal. The duals of isotoxal polygons are isogonal polygons. Isotoxal -gons are centrally symmetric, so are also zonogons.

In general, an isotoxal -gon has  dihedral symmetry. For example, a rhombus is an isotoxal "×-gon" (quadrilateral) with  symmetry. All regular polygons (equilateral triangle, square, etc.) are isotoxal, having double the minimum symmetry order: a regular -gon has  dihedral symmetry.

An isotoxal -gon with outer internal angle  can be labeled as  The inner internal angle  may be greater or less than  degrees, making convex or concave polygons.

Concave inner vertices can be defined for  If  then  is "reduced" to a compound  of  rotated copies of 

A set of "uniform tilings", actually isogonal tilings using isotoxal polygons as less symmetric faces than regular ones, can be defined.

Isotoxal polyhedra and tilings 

Regular polyhedra are isohedral (face-transitive), isogonal (vertex-transitive), and isotoxal (edge-transitive).

Quasiregular polyhedra, like the cuboctahedron and the icosidodecahedron, are isogonal and isotoxal, but not isohedral. Their duals, including the rhombic dodecahedron and the rhombic triacontahedron, are isohedral and isotoxal, but not isogonal.

Not every polyhedron or 2-dimensional tessellation constructed from regular polygons is isotoxal. For instance, the truncated icosahedron (the familiar soccerball) is not isotoxal, as it has two edge types: hexagon-hexagon and hexagon-pentagon, and it is not possible for a symmetry of the solid to move a hexagon-hexagon edge onto a hexagon-pentagon edge.

An isotoxal polyhedron has the same dihedral angle for all edges.

The dual of a convex polyhedron is also a convex polyhedron.

The dual of a non-convex polyhedron is also a non-convex polyhedron. (By contraposition.)

The dual of an isotoxal polyhedron is also an isotoxal polyhedron. (See the Dual polyhedron article.)

There are nine convex isotoxal polyhedra: the five (regular) Platonic solids, the two (quasiregular) common cores of dual Platonic solids, and their two duals.

There are fourteen non-convex isotoxal polyhedra: the four (regular) Kepler–Poinsot polyhedra, the two (quasiregular) common cores of dual Kepler–Poinsot polyhedra, and their two duals, plus the three quasiregular ditrigonal (3 | p q) star polyhedra, and their three duals.

There are at least five isotoxal polyhedral compounds: the five regular polyhedral compounds; their five duals are also the five regular polyhedral compounds (or one chiral twin).

There are at least five isotoxal polygonal tilings of the Euclidean plane, and infinitely many isotoxal polygonal tilings of the hyperbolic plane, including the Wythoff constructions from the regular hyperbolic tilings {p,q}, and non-right (p q r) groups.

See also 
 Table of polyhedron dihedral angles
 Vertex-transitive
 Face-transitive
 Cell-transitive

References 

 Peter R. Cromwell, Polyhedra, Cambridge University Press 1997, p. 371 Transitivity
  (6.4 Isotoxal tilings, 309-321)
 

Polyhedra
4-polytopes